Gérard Araud (born 20 February 1953) is a retired French diplomat who served as Ambassador of France to the United States from 2014 to 2019. He previously served as Director General for Political and Security Affairs of the Ministry of Foreign Affairs (2006–2009) and France's permanent representative to the United Nations (2009–2014).

Early life and education
Gérard Araud was born in Marseille. He holds engineering degrees from the École Polytechnique and École nationale de la statistique et de l'administration économique. Araud, who also graduated from the Institut d'études politiques de Paris, is an alumnus of the École nationale d'administration (class of 1982).

Career
Araud's first posting was at the embassy of France in Tel Aviv as First Secretary, from 1982 to 1984. He was then assigned to Paris, at the Analysis and Policy Planning Staff of the Ministry of Foreign Affairs where he was responsible for Middle East issues. From 1987 to 1991 he was Counselor at the Embassy of France in Washington, where he was also responsible for Middle East issues. He was Assistant Director of European Community Affairs at the Ministry of Foreign Affairs from 1991 to 1993 and became Diplomatic Advisor to the French Minister of Defense François Léotard in 1993.

Araud joined the French delegation to the North Atlantic Council (NATO) in Brussels in 1995 as Deputy Permanent Representative. He became Director for Strategic Affairs, Security and Disarmament at the Ministry of Foreign Affairs in 2000. He was Ambassador of France to Israel from 2003 to 2006.

In September 2006, Araud was appointed Director General for Political Affairs and Security, Deputy Secretary General of the Ministry of Foreign Affairs. On July 15, 2009, he was appointed Permanent Representative of France to the Security Council and Head of the Permanent Mission of France to the United Nations. He presented his credentials to Ban Ki-moon, United Nations Secretary-General, on 10 September 10, 2009. He served as the President of the Security Council in February 2010, May 2011, August 2012, and December 2013.

On July 23, 2014 Araud was appointed Ambassador of France to the United States by presidential decree.

On the night of the election of Donald Trump as president, Araud tweeted: "It is the end of an era, the era of neoliberalism. We don't yet know what will succeed it," followed by: "After Brexit and this election anything is possible. A world is collapsing before our eyes. Vertigo." Reading this as an undiplomatic expression of dismay at the result, right-wing French political activists called for Araud's dismissal, which did not occur.

On Pearl Harbor Day in 2017, Araud lodged a political insult against the United States by issuing a tweet that said, "In this Pearl Harbor day, we should remember that the US refused to side with France and the UK to confront the fascist powers in the 30s." After the tweet was met with criticism, Araud deleted it and attempted to clarify his remarks.

In July 2018, Araud sent a letter to The Daily Show host, Trevor Noah. Noah made comments on his show regarding the multiethnicity of the France national football team following their win in the 2018 FIFA World Cup. Araud criticized Noah’s remarks and sent him a formal letter. Noah responded to the letter in between scenes of his show. His comments were also added to Twitter, where Araud declared an end to the argument.

In 2019 when retiring from being the French ambassador to the United States, Araud gave an assessment of Trump and drew a comparison to French history. He described the Trump administration as having the polar opposite of the meticulous decision-making process of the Obama administration, resembling that of Louis XIV, an old ruler who was a "whimsical, unpredictable, uninformed" leader who nonetheless wanted to be making the decisions, and he noted that Trump's "unpredictability and his single-minded transactional interpretation of US interests was leaving the administration isolated on the world stage." He also provided some advice in an interview with Politico, "keep cool". Before leaving his post in Washington, Araud described the city as being full of provincial early-bird dinners, "sad" baggy suits, and awful jeans.

Other activities
 International Crisis Group (ICG), Board of Trustees (since 2019)
 Araud currently serves as Senior Advisor at Albright Stonebridge Group.

Personal life
Araud is openly gay and supports same-sex marriage. His long-time partner is photographer Pascal Blondeau.

See also

References

External links
 Website of the Embassy of France in the United States of America
 Website of the French Ministry of Foreign Affairs and International Development

1953 births
Ambassadors of France to Israel
Ambassadors of France to the United States
École nationale d'administration alumni
École Polytechnique alumni
Gay diplomats
French gay men
Living people
Diplomats from Marseille
Permanent Representatives of France to the United Nations
Sciences Po alumni